Captain Edmund Moody (also spelled Mody, Moodye, and Mondye)  (1495–28 May 1552) was an English soldier and Member of Parliament for Dover.

It is contended that Captain Moody is sometimes mistakenly credited with saving the life of Henry VIII, as he shares the same name as a footman who saved the king from drowning.

Biography

Captain and Bailiff of Dover Castle

Moody was appointed Captain of the newly constructed Black Bulwark at Dover in September 1534. In July 1537, Moody was granted the Baliffship of Dover, to which he succeeded in 1543, subsequent to the death of Thomas Vaughan. In 1543, he was made a freeman of Dover and bought property in the town’s Snargare and Werston wards. He was a member of the Brotherhood of the Cinque Ports.

Moody is mentioned in The Inventory of Henry VIII’s assets on his death, which is now held in the British Library as Harley Manuscript no. 1419, where he is stated to be the occupant of a bulwark of Dover Castle that was adjacent to Dover Cliff.

Member of Parliament for Dover

In 1545, Moody became Member of Parliament (MP) for Dover. In 1546, he was granted another annuity of £20. In 1547, he attended the Coronation of Edward VI.

Marriage and Death
Moody married a woman named Margery and had at least one son, named Christopher.
 
Moody died on 28 May 1552. In his will, he requested that he be buried in St. Mary's, Dover, 'in a chancel where the alderman do sit' and stipulated that small bequest were to be left to the officers of Dover Castle. His ship, named the Christopher, passed, together with his goods and leases, to his wife. He was succeeded as Bailiff of Dover by his deputy Thomas Portway.

References

Further reading

1552 deaths
Members of the Parliament of England for Dover
English MPs 1545–1547
1495 births